The Old Town Historic District in Hartford, Kentucky is a historic district which was listed on the National Register of Historic Places in 1988.

The  listed area included 17 contributing buildings and a contributing structure.

The district is roughly bounded by E. Union, Clay, E. Washington and Liberty Streets.  It includes the Hartford Seminary, which is separately listed on the National Register.

References

Historic districts on the National Register of Historic Places in Kentucky
Greek Revival architecture in Kentucky
Victorian architecture in Kentucky
Late 19th and Early 20th Century American Movements architecture
National Register of Historic Places in Ohio County, Kentucky
Hartford, Kentucky